Francisco "Paco" Figueroa  (born February 19, 1983) is an American former professional baseball second baseman and current coach. He is the first base, outfield, and base running coach for the Philadelphia Phillies of Major League Baseball (MLB).

Baseball career
Figueroa was born in Miami, Florida.  He played baseball at Gulliver Prep High School and was drafted by the Atlanta Braves in the 42nd round of the 2001 MLB Draft but did not sign, opting instead to attend the University of Miami. In 2003, he played collegiate summer baseball with the Brewster Whitecaps of the Cape Cod Baseball League, and returned to the league in 2004 to play for the Bourne Braves. He was drafted again, this time by the Baltimore Orioles in the 9th round of the 2005 MLB Draft. 

He played in the Orioles system through 2010 and spent a year in AA with the Philadelphia Phillies in 2011. In 2012, he was with the Southern Maryland Blue Crabs in the Atlantic League of Professional Baseball.

In seven minor league seasons playing shortstop, second base, and outfield he batted .285/.366/.370 with 8 home runs and 72 stolen bases in 1,798 at bats.

He also played for the Spain national baseball team in the 2009 Baseball World Cup, where he won the "Best Batter" award, and the 2013 World Baseball Classic.

Figueroa was named the first base, outfield, and base running coach for the Philadelphia Phillies prior to the 2019 season.

Personal life
His identical twin brother, Daniel Figueroa, was his teammate at Miami. Both were drafted by the Orioles in 2005, and they played together in the minors and with the Spanish national team.

References

External links

1983 births
Living people
2013 World Baseball Classic players
Aberdeen IronBirds players
Baseball coaches from Florida
Baseball players from Miami
Baseball second basemen
Bourne Braves players
Bowie Baysox players
Brewster Whitecaps players
Delmarva Shorebirds players
Frederick Keys players
Gulf Coast Orioles players
Honolulu Sharks players
Major League Baseball first base coaches
Miami Hurricanes baseball players
Minor league baseball coaches
Norfolk Tides players
Philadelphia Phillies coaches
Reading Phillies players
Southern Maryland Blue Crabs players
Sports coaches from Miami
Twin sportspeople